The 1923–24 League of Ireland was the third season of top-tier football in the Republic of Ireland. It began on 8 September 1923 and ended on 13 May 1924.

Shamrock Rovers were the defending champions.

Changes from 1922–23 
Three teams were not re-elected to the league: Dublin United, Olympia and Rathmines Athletic. Only one new team was elected: Brooklyn, reducing the League to ten teams.

Season overview 
Bohemians won their first title.

Teams

Standings

Results

Top goalscorers

Source:

See also
1923–24 FAI Cup

References

Ireland
League Of Ireland, 1922-23
League of Ireland seasons